The Marditjali were an Indigenous Australian people, a small tribe distinct from the Jaadwa, whose lands extended from the state of Victoria to South Australia.

Name 
Marditjali may not be the term used by the tribe itself, but an exonym applied to them by tribes to their west. Since the ethnonym is composed of two words marti ("abrupt/difficult to understand") and tjale (speech) from Westernj languages indicating their language was hard to grasp.

Language
The Marditjali name for their language is unknown, but it was called Wintjabarap, designating the Wintjintanga horde by tribes to their west.

Country
Naracoorte in South Australia to the Victorian Wimmera area of Goroke and west of Mount Arapiles; They ranged as far south as Struan, Apsley, and Edenhope. Their northern boundaries were around Bangham, Kaniva, and Servicetown.

Marditjali tribal areas were characterized by swampy zones encircled by imposing country was characterized by large red gum forests The frontier with the Bungandidj (Buandik) around Eden hope was marked by a brusque change in tree type, as red gums yielded to scrub gums. Their western boundaries with the Meintangk on the Naracoorte Range are likewise ecologically defined by the rising terraces of wooded lime sand dunes.

Social organisation 
The Marditjali were divided into several camps
 Witjintanga

Alternative names
 Worangarait ([wora] = plain country, [ngara] = to exist in-name applied by Bunganditj)
 Worangarit, Wragarait
 Wintjabarap (language name)
 Lake Wallace tribe
 Keribial-barap
 Witjintanga
 Wichintunga

Some words
 bangg (man)

Notes

Citations

Sources

Aboriginal peoples of South Australia
Aboriginal peoples of Victoria (Australia)
History of Victoria (Australia)